The extreme points of Latvia are the points on Latvia's land territory that are furthest north, south, east and west.

Latitude and longitude 
 North: Ipiķi Parish, Valmiera Municipality
 South: Demene Parish, Augšdaugava Municipality
 West: Cape Bernāti, Nīca Parish, South Kurzeme Municipality
 East: Pasiene Parish, Ludza Municipality

Latvija saules zīmē

The project was called Latvija saules zīmē, "Latvia in the Sun sign". The names and locations of the individual sculptures are as follows:
 North: Baltās naktis ("White nights")
 South: Saules puķe ("Sunflower")
 West: Zaļais stars ("Green ray")
 East: Austras koks ("Tree of Dawn")

Extremes in elevation 

 Maximum: Gaiziņkalns, 
 Minimum: Baltic Sea, 0 meters

See also 
 Geography of Latvia
 Extreme points of Earth

References

Latvia
Lists of coordinates
extreme